Ersin Kaya (born 5 July 1993) is an Australian footballer who lasted played as a right winger or right back for National Premier Leagues Victoria club Hume City.

Club career
After being a part of the Australian Institute of Sport set-up in 2009, Ersin Kaya signed for Turkish-backed Victorian Premier League club Hume City FC in 2010. Kaya then moved to Victorian State League Division 1 side Moreland Zebras, where he linked up with current coach Domenic Barba. Kaya won promotion to the VPL with the Zebras at the age of 17. After that, Kaya joined the Melbourne Heart youth squad in 2012, before returning to play VPL with Hume City FC, Northcote City FC and Werribee City FC. He then spent a year in Turkey with Bayrampasaspor before returning to Victoria, joining the newly promoted FC Bulleen Lions in 2016.

References 

Living people
1993 births
Association football defenders
A-League Men players
Melbourne City FC players
Australian people of Turkish descent
Hume City FC players
Australian soccer players
Australia youth international soccer players
Soccer players from Melbourne
Australian expatriate sportspeople in Turkey
Australian expatriate soccer players
Australian Institute of Sport soccer players
Expatriate footballers in Turkey
Bayrampaşaspor footballers